Ștefan Nicolau may refer to:

Ștefan Gh. Nicolau (1874–1970), Romanian physician
Ștefan S. Nicolau (1896–1967), Romanian physician